David "Dodo" Abashidze (1 May 1924 – 26 January 1990) was a Soviet Georgian film actor and director. Abashidze, who joined the Communist Party in 1960, was named People’s Artist of Georgia in 1967. After his passing, a Tbilisi street was named in his honor.<ref>{{cite news|url=https://movies.nytimes.com/movie/review?res=9B0DE6DB103CF93BA25751C0A961948260|title=Legenda Suramskoi Kreposti|date=18 February 1987|work=The New York Times|quote=The reputation of Sergei Paradjanov, who directed along with Dodo Abashidze, rests largely on The Color of Pomegrantes...|accessdate=4 October 2011}}</ref> He appeared in 50 films between 1954 and 1988.

Abashidze studied at the Shota Rustaveli Theater Institute in Tbilisi, graduating in 1949. He then joined the troupe of the Rustaveli Theater but after a few years dedicated himself fully to cinema. Abashidze’s film debut was the role of Bichiko in Siko Dolidze’s comedy The Dragonfly (1954, from Nikoloz Baratashvili’s Marine), which became a box-office hit throughout the USSR. Over the following three decades, the actor worked with all leading directors of Georgian cinema and worked in a variety of genres ranging from historical adventure to contemporary drama and musical comedy. Tengiz Abuladze and Revaz Chkheidze cast him in their successful joint debut Magdana’s Donkey (1955), Otar Ioseliani in Falling Leaves (1966), Eldar Shengelaia in Unusual Exhibition (1968), and Georgi Danelia in Don't Grieve (1969). Another notable role was of the shepherd Sosana who resists urban modernization in The Grand Green Valley (1968).

One of Abashidze's greatest achievements was the co-direction of two pictures with Sergei Paradjanov: The Legend of Suram Fortress (1984) and Ashik Kerib (1988), where he also acted as well.

Filmography
As an Actor

 The Dragonfly (1954)
 Magdana's Donkey (1956)
 Bashi-Achuki (1956)
 Eteris simgera (1957)
 Me vitkvi simartles (1957)
 Ori odjakhi (1958)
 Tetri gameebi (TV Movie) (1958)
 Chiakokona (1961)
 Udiplomo sasidzo (1961)
 Burti da moedani (Short) (1961)
 Mission (1961) as D. Abashidze
 The White Caravan (1963)
 Zgvis shvilebi (1964)
 Khevsuruli balada (1966)
 Falling Leaves (1966)
 Male gazapkhuli mova (1967)
 Great Green Valley (1967)
 Unusual Exhibition (1968)
 Tariel Golua (1968)
 Don't Grieve (1969)
 Pirosmani (1969)
 Didostatis Marjvena (pirveli seria) (1969)
 Sinatle chvens panjrebshi (1969)
 Melodies of Vera Quarter (1973)
 Ar Daijero, Rom agar var (1975)
 Sakme gadaetsema sasamartlos (TV Movie) (1976)
 Ramdenime interviu pirad sakitkhebze (1976)
 Mtsvervali (1976)
 Namdvili tbiliselebi da skhvebi (1976)
 Data Tutashkhia (TV Series) (1977)
 Racha, chemi sikvaruli (1977)
 Qalaqi Anara (1978)
 Kvarkvare (1978)
 Fedia (Short) (1978)
 Qortsineba imerulad (TV Movie) (1978)
 Pokhishcheniye veka (1981)
 Matsivarshi vigats ijda (1983)
 Tsigni pitsisa (1983)
 The Legend of Suram Fortress (1985)
 Pesvebi (1987)
 Ashik Kerib (1987)
As director
 The Legend of Suram Fortress (1985) co-director
 Ashik Kerib'' (1988) co-director

References

External links
 

1924 births
1990 deaths
Actors from Tbilisi
Soviet male film actors
Soviet film directors
Male film actors from Georgia (country)
Film directors from Georgia (country)
Film people from Tbilisi